Teratoscincus roborowskii is a small species of gecko, a lizard in the family Sphaerodactylidae. The species is endemic to northwestern China.

Etymology
The specific name, roborowskii, is in honor of Russian explorer Vladimir Ivanovich Roborovski (1856–1910).

Geographic range
T. roborowskii is found in Xinjiang Uygur Autonomous Region, China.

Habitat

Reproduction
T. roborowskii is oviparous.

References

Further reading
Bedriaga J von (1906) ("1905"). "Verzeichnis der von der Central-Asiatischen Expedition unter Stabs-Kapitän W. Roborowski in den Jahren 1893–1895 gesammelten Reptilien ". Annuaire du Musée Zoologique de l'Académie Impériale des Sciences de St.-Pétersbourg 10 (3-4): 159–200. (Teratoscincus roborowskii, new species, pp. 159–160). (in German).
Leptien, Rolf; Wai Lui (1997). "Ein Gecko von der alten Seidenstraße im Nordwesten Chinas, Teratoscincus roborowskii Von Bedriaga, 1906 ". Sauria 19 (2): 3–6. (in German).
Rösler, Herbert (2000). "Kommentierte Liste der rezent, subrezent und fossil bekannten Geckotaxa (Reptilia: Gekkonomorpha) ". Gekkota 2: 28–153. (Teratoscincus roborowskii, p. 118). (in German).

Teratoscincus
Endemic fauna of China
Reptiles of China
Reptiles described in 1906